Paul Steven Sangren (born April 2, 1946) is a socio-cultural anthropologist of China and Taiwan, and is a leading expert in the study of Chinese religion. He is Hu Shih Distinguished Professor of Chinese Studies and Anthropology Emeritus at Cornell University. His research interests include socio-cultural anthropology, religion and ritual, gender, psychoanalysis, practice, China and Taiwan.

Early life
Sangren was born on April 2, 1946, in Kalamazoo, Michigan. He earned his B.A. from Woodrow Wilson School, Princeton University in 1968. After Princeton, he joined the Navy and attended the U.S. Naval Officer Candidate School at Newport, Rhode Island. Subsequently, Sangren was commissioned as a LTJG and served in the Underwater Demolition Team Eleven from 1969 to 1972. In 1972, Sangren headed for Stanford University to pursue his Ph.D in anthropology under the supervision of G. William Skinner. He conducted fieldwork on the Mazu's cult in Taiwan between 1974 and 1977. Sangren received his Ph.D. in January 1980.

Academic career
After completing his Ph.D. in 1980, Sangren became an assistant professor of anthropology at Cornell University. He was promoted to Associate Professor in 1986 and to Professor in 1992. Sangren was the associate director of Cornell's East Asia Program between 1988 and 1989, and chair of Cornell's Anthropology department between 1997-2000. Sangren was named the Hu Shih Distinguished Professor of China Studies in 2017.

Notes

American anthropologists
American sinologists
1946 births
Cornell University faculty
Princeton School of Public and International Affairs alumni
Stanford University alumni
Living people